The 1991 Cardiff City Council election was held on Thursday 2 May 1991 to the district council of Cardiff in South Glamorgan, Wales. It took place on the same day as other district council elections in Wales and England. The Labour Party regained a majority on Cardiff City Council, after sharing government for the previous four years.

The previous Cardiff City Council election took place in 1987. The 1991 election was to be the final election to the district council before its dissolution and replacement, in 1995, by the new County Council of the City and County of Cardiff unitary authority.

Overview
All 65 council seats were up for election, though the election in the safe Conservative ward of Heath was delayed, with the results coming later (though not affecting Labour's majority control). Since 1987 Labour had governed in coalition with the SDP-Liberal Alliance. Following the 1991 election it regained a majority on the council.

One of the major upsets of the election was the next Cardiff Lord Mayor-to-be, Gerald Brinks, losing his Roath seat. His designated successor, Anthea Thomas, also lost her seat in Llanishen. This meant Cllr Jeff Sainsbury unexpectedly became the new Lord Mayor, four years earlier than planned, as well as leader of the Conservative group on the council.

Labour made 11 gains and lost only one seat, to Independent Betty Campbell, in Butetown. The Conservatives lost 8 seats and the Liberal Democrats lost three.

 

|}

Ward Results

Contests were held in all twenty-six wards:(a)(b)

Adamsdown (2 seats)

Butetown (1 seat)

Caerau (2 seats)

Canton (3 seats)

Cathays (3 seats)

Cyncoed (3 seats)

Ely (3 seats)

Fairwater (3 seats)

Gabalfa (1 seat)

Grangetown (3 seats)

Heath (3 seats)

The contest in the Heath ward was suspended until after the main election, with the result declared at a later date.

Lisvane and St Mellons (1 seat)

Llandaff (2 seats)

Llandaff North (2 seats)

Llanishen (3 seats)

Llanrumney (3 seats)

Pentwyn (3 seats)

Plasnewydd (4 seats)

Radyr & St Fagans (1 seat)

Rhiwbina (3 seats)

Riverside (3 seats)

Roath (3 seats)

Rumney (2 seats)

Splott (2 seats)

Trowbridge (2 seats)

Whitchurch & Tongwynlais (4 seats) 

(a) Elections Centre source also indicates pre-existing 'retiring' ward councillors, whether candidate is female, compares the percentage vote of the lead candidate for each party in the ward

(b) South Wales Echo source also indicates pre-existing 'retiring' ward councillors, candidates' full initials, whether the result was 'no change' or a 'gain'

* pre-existing 'retiring' ward councillors at this election

See also
 1987 Cardiff City Council election
 1995 Cardiff Council election

References

Council elections in Cardiff
Cardiff
1990s in Cardiff
Council elections in South Glamorgan